Nazim Hajiyev can refer to:
 Nazim Mammadiyya oglu Hajiyev
 Nazim Hajiyev (activist)